Drakkars in the Mist is the third album by the musical project Folkearth.

Track listing
 "Before Battle I Embrace" – 3:57
 "Hoplites Awaiting Command" – 3:38
 "Hugin & Munin" – 4:29
 "Griminsmol (The Ballad of Grimnir)" – 3:55
 "Högtid" – 2:17
 "Sworn to the Raven" – 4:56
 "Great God Pan" – 4:21
 "Drakkars in the Mist" – 4:38
 "Midgard Farewell" – 4:00
 "De Tause Fjell" – 3:50
 "If I Should Fall" – 2:25
 "When Long Ships Arrive" – 4:21
 "On Wings Divine" – 4:51
 "Thunders of War" – 2:56

Bonus tracks
"The Bane of Giants" – 4:30
"Kingdom of the Shades" – 3:58
"The Riding of the Queen Boudiccea" – 4:35

Personnel

Instruments
Greece
Marios "Prince Imrahil" Koutsoukos (Dol Amroth) - spoken vocal, scream vocal,  choir vocal, keyboard
Stefanos Koutsoukos (Dol Amroth) - bass, acoustic guitar
Nikos Nezeritis (Dol Amroth) - keyboard
Polydeykis (Zion) - 6 and 12-string acoustic guitar, keyboard, piano, recorder, tin whistle, bağlama, accordion, lead and backing choir, male vocal, narration, Thracian bagpipes
Thanasis Karapanos - lead and backing male vocal, electric guitar, drums, keyboard
Hildr Valkyrie (Hildr Valkyrie) - lead and backing female vocal, spoken vocal, drum programming, keyboard
Faethon - bass, choir vocal

Lithuania
Ruslanas - tin whistle

Sweden
Magnus Wohlfart (Nae'blis) - guitar, vocal, keyboard, drums
William Ekeberg (Broken Dagger) - vocal
Simon Frodeberg - bass, vocal

Germany
Morten Basse (Thulr)

United States
Dreogan (Peordh) - electric guitar, bass
Mark Riddick (The Soil Bleeds Black) - bodhrán, sopranino recorder, soprano recorder, tenor recorder

Italy
Axel (Death Army) - electric guitar, bass, drums
Raven - Celtic harp, backing vocal
Ulven (Draugen) - acoustic guitar

Belgium
Roman Samonin (Morituri)
Ralf Goossens (Morituri)

Croatia
Vojan Koceic (Koziak)

Norway
Haavard Tveito (Vetter) - electric guitar, bass, vocal

Russia
Orey (Pagan Reign) - guitar, domra
Vetrodar (Pagan Reign) - flute, guitar, naylon guitar

Spain
Autumn (Hordak) - vocals, guitar, drum programming
Winter (Hordak) - guitar, bass, drum programming
Antonio Mansilla (Last Deception) - chorus
Jesus Sierra (Last Deception) - drums
Jose Luis Frias - flute, pipes
GG Karman - chorus
A. Pangin - flute

Writing and production
lyrics by: Marios "Prince Imrahil" Koutsoukos, Polydeykis, Haavard Tveito and Autumn
music by: Marios "Prince Imrahil" Koutsoukos, Polydeykis, Ulven, Raven, Haavard Tveito, Orey, Vetrodar, Autumn, Winter, Magnus Wohlfart and Dreogan
orchestration by: Polydeykis and Thanasis Karapanos
sound technicians: Antonio Mansilla and GG Karman

See also
 Prince Imrahil (Middle-earth)

2007 albums
Folkearth albums